The boules sports events at the 2001 World Games in Akita was played between 17 and 19 August. 54 competitors, from 14 nations, participated in the tournament. The boules sports competition took place at World Games Plaza.

Participating nations

Medal table

Events

Men's events

Women's events

References

External links
 Boules sports on IWGA website
 Results

 
2001 World Games
2001